Sir Narcisse-Fortunat Belleau  (October 20, 1808 – September 14, 1894) was a Canadian politician who served as the first Lieutenant Governor of Quebec. Prior to Canadian Confederation, he served as the leader of the Parti bleu in Canada East.

Early life 
He was born in Quebec City in 1808. He studied at the Petit Séminaire de Québec and went on to article in law, receiving his license to practice in 1832. In 1835, he married Marie-Reine-Josephte, the daughter of Quebec merchant Louis Gauvreau. In 1848, he ran unsuccessfully as a Reformer in Portneuf. In the same year, he was elected to the city council for Quebec and served as mayor from 1850 to 1853. During his term as mayor, a system providing drinking water was installed in the city. He served on the board of the Quebec Bank, later merged with the Royal Bank of Canada, from 1848 to 1893.

Political career
In 1852, he was appointed to the Legislative Council of the Province of Canada. He became a Queen's Counsel in 1854. In 1857, he was named speaker of the Legislative Council and so became a member of the Executive Council. He was knighted in 1860. He became premier for Canada East and receiver general in 1865 on the death of Sir Étienne-Paschal Taché and served in that role until Confederation. He was nominated for a seat in the Senate of Canada in 1867 but withdrew when he was named the first Lieutenant Governor of Quebec in July of the same year. He refused a seat in the Senate when he retired from this post in 1873. He was made a Knight Commander of the Order of St Michael and St George in 1879.

Later life 
After politics, Belleau continued to sit on the board of the Quebec Bank and took an active role in social functions. He maintained his political influence.

He died at Quebec City in 1894 and left his fortune, which contemporaries estimated as between $200,000 and $400,000, to his nephew.

References

External links 
 

 
 

1808 births
1894 deaths
Mayors of Quebec City
Members of the Legislative Council of the Province of Canada
Canadian Knights Commander of the Order of St Michael and St George
Conservative Party of Canada (1867–1942) senators
Lieutenant Governors of Quebec
Premiers of the Province of Canada
Canadian King's Counsel
French Quebecers
Members of the Legislative Assembly of the Province of Canada from Canada East